Orthoceras may refer to :
 Orthoceras (cephalopod), an extinct cephalopod genus
 Orthoceras (plant), an orchid genus